One on One is Cheap Trick's sixth studio album, and seventh release in general. Produced by Roy Thomas Baker, it was released in 1982 via Epic Records and was the first Cheap Trick album to feature their new bassist Jon Brant.

Background
Nearly two years after their last LP All Shook Up, Cheap Trick released an album full of brash, simple rockers. After original bassist Tom Petersson left the group in 1980, he was replaced by Pete Comita. Comita left the group in the early recording stages of One on One and was replaced by Jon Brant. Though this was the first album to feature Brant, most of it was recorded without him. Guitarist Rick Nielsen played bass on all but three tracks ("Saturday at Midnight", "If You Want My Love" and "She's Tight").  Brant's face is partially obscured on the front cover. The song "If You Want My Love" is one of Nielsen's favorite songs he has recorded with the group.

Physical copies of the album were out of print for several years (with the exception of Japan), but as of April 6, 2010 it has been reissued along with the following album Next Position Please on one CD, which has since also gone out of print. There were promotional videos made for "She's Tight" and "If You Want My Love." Both received heavy rotation on MTV.

Reception

Upon release, Billboard stated: "The big beat pop-rockers shelve the more ambitious pop experimentation of [their last] LP to return to the stylistic mix that reaped top ten success in the past. Roy Thomas Baker proves an apt ally, showcasing Nielsen's brash wall-of-guitars attack and accentuating the raspier reaches of Zander's lead vocals to create a strong collection of overdrive anthems. Christopher Connelly of Rolling Stone wrote: "One on One suggests that although guitarist-songwriter Rick Nielsen's AC/DC fixation continues unabated, there remains cause for hope." He listed songs such as "She's Tight", "Time Is Runnin'" and "If You Want My Love" as some of the album's "tantalizing moments", and "I Want You" and "Lookin' Out for Number One" as two of the album's "depressingly moronic cuts".

In a retrospective review, Stephen Thomas Erlewine of AllMusic stated: "One on One finds Cheap Trick rebounding from [the George Martin-produced All Shook Up] with a slick, punchy, AOR record, hemmed in a bit by stiff sequenced rhythms but sparkling in its analog synths and pumped-up guitars. No, it's not as ballsy as Cheap Trick's best, but its glossy glimmer is appealing, a combination of heavy metal roar and new wave strut, and would be more so if the songs were just a bit tighter." Dave Swanson of Ultimate Classic Rock noted Baker's production gave the band a "harder but glossier sound". He highlighted the tracks "I Want You", "She's Tight", "If You Want My Love", "Time Is Runnin'" and "Love's Got a Hold on Me", but felt the "rest of the album ends up tripping over itself by the end".

Track listing
All tracks written by Rick Nielsen, except where noted.

Remastered CD reissues include an extended version of "If You Want My Love" as a bonus track, however, this is not included on the version found in the Complete Epic Albums box set. It was, however, included on the Sex, America, Cheap Trick boxed set

Outtakes and demos
"All I Really Want" – 2:32 (B-Side to the "She's Tight" single, also available on the Sex, America, Cheap Trick box set)
"Don't Make Our Love a Crime (demo)" – 3:34 (Available on the Sex, America, Cheap Trick box set)
"Whatcha Gonna Do About It (demo)" (Small Faces cover) – 2:38 (Available on the Bun E.'s Basement Bootlegs "Covers" album)
"If You Want My Love (demo)" – 4:34 (Available on the "Oh Boy (Demo)"/"If You Want My Love (Demo)" promotional single)

Personnel

Cheap Trick
 Robin Zander – lead vocals, rhythm guitar 
 Rick Nielsen – lead guitar, vocals, bass guitar, keyboards 
 Bun E. Carlos – drums, percussion
 Jon Brant – backing vocals, bass guitar on "She's Tight", "If You Want My Love", and "Saturday at Midnight"

Technical
 Roy Thomas Baker – producer
 Ian Taylor – engineer
 Paul Klingberg – assistant
 George Marino – mastering
 David Michael Kennedy – photographer album cover

Chart performance

Album

Weekly Charts

Year End Charts

2017 reissue

Singles

Certifications

References

Cheap Trick albums
1982 albums
Epic Records albums
Albums produced by Roy Thomas Baker